20th Visual Effects Society Awards
March 8, 2022

Outstanding Visual Effects in a Photoreal Feature:
Dune

Outstanding Visual Effects in a Photoreal Episode:
Foundation - The Emperor's Peace

The 20th Visual Effects Society Awards was an awards ceremony held by the Visual Effects Society. Nominations were announced on January 18, 2022, and the ceremony took place on March 8, 2022.

Nominees

Honorary Awards
Lifetime Achievement Award:
Lynwen Brennan
VES Award for Creative Excellence
Guillermo del Toro

Film

Television

Other categories

References

External links
 Visual Effects Society

2022
2021 film awards
2021 television awards